Masks (German: Masken) is a 1920 German silent film directed by William Wauer and starring Albert Bassermann and Elsa Bassermann. It was part of a group of expressionist films released during the period.

The film's sets were designed by the art directors Robert Herlth and Walter Röhrig.

Cast
 Albert Bassermann
 Elsa Bassermann
 Kurt Keller-Nebri
 Albert Paul
 Rolf Prasch
 Maat St. Clair
 Rose Veldtkirch

References

Bibliography
 Bock, Hans-Michael & Bergfelder, Tim. The Concise Cinegraph: Encyclopaedia of German Cinema. Berghahn Books, 2009.

External links

1920 films
Films of the Weimar Republic
German silent feature films
Films directed by William Wauer
German black-and-white films
German anthology films